Lena Krier (born 29 March 1994) is a Luxembourger footballer who plays as a goalkeeper for Dames Ligue 1 club SC Bettembourg and the Luxembourg women's national team.

References

1994 births
Living people
Women's association football goalkeepers
Luxembourgian women's footballers
Luxembourg women's international footballers